"Money (That's What I Want)" is a rhythm and blues song written by Tamla founder Berry Gordy and Janie Bradford, which was the first hit record for Gordy's Motown enterprise. Barrett Strong recorded it in 1959 as a single for the Tamla label, distributed nationally on Anna Records.  Many artists later recorded the tune, including the Beatles in 1963 and the Flying Lizards in 1979.

Composition and recording
The song developed out of a spontaneous recording session at the Hitsville studio A in Detroit. Gordy and Strong began by improvising on piano and vocals and were joined by Benny Benjamin on drums and Brian Holland on tambourine. Authors Jim Cogan and William Clark only identify the guitarist and bass guitarist as "two white kids walking home from high school [who] heard the music out on the street and wandered in to Hitsville [and] asked if they could play along." They add "Strong claimed he never saw the two boys who played bass and guitar again." However, the guitarist has also been identified as Eugene Grew, who claimed that Barrett showed him what to play.

Barrett begins with a bluesy piano riff, with the rest of the instruments gradually falling in. The figure is a key element of the song and is repeated throughout the piece by the piano, bass guitar and guitar, with background vocals by the Rayber Voices. Author Nick Talevski calls the song an "R&B classic" and it is identified as having a "Detroit R&B sound" by Mark Lewisohn. Music journalist Charles Shaar Murray describes "Money" as "one of the earliest Motown classics from the days when the label left some of R&B's rough edges in place."

Releases
The song was originally recorded by Barrett Strong and released on Tamla in August 1959. Anna Records was operated by Gwen Gordy, Anna Gordy and Roquel "Billy" Davis. Gwen and Anna's brother Berry Gordy had just established his Tamla label (soon Motown would follow) and licensed the song to the Anna label in 1960, which was distributed nationwide by Chicago-based Chess Records in order to meet demand; the Tamla record was a resounding success in the Midwestern United States.

In the US, the single became Motown's first hit in June 1960, making it to number two on the Hot R&B Sides chart and number 23 on the Billboard Hot 100. The song was listed as number 288 on Rolling Stones "The 500 Greatest Songs of All Time". Greil Marcus has pointed out that "Money" was the only song that brought Strong's name near the top of the national music charts, "but that one time has kept him on the radio all his life."

Personnel
Personnel included:
Barrett Strong – vocals
Berry Gordy – piano
Benny Benjamin – drums
Eugene Grew – guitar
Brian Holland – tambourine

Writing credits dispute
Singer Barrett Strong claims that he co-wrote the song with Berry Gordy and Janie Bradford. His name was removed from the copyright registration three years after the song was written, restored in 1987 when the copyright was renewed, and then excised again the following year. Gordy has stated that Strong's name was only included because of a clerical error.

The Beatles version

Recording
The Beatles recorded "Money" in seven takes on July 18, 1963. A series of piano overdubs was later added by producer George Martin. The song was released in November 1963 as the final track on their second UK album, With the Beatles.

According to George Harrison, the group discovered Strong's version in Brian Epstein's NEMS record store (though not a hit in the UK, it had been issued on London Records in 1960). They had previously performed it during their audition at Decca Records on January 1, 1962, with Pete Best still on drums at the time. They also recorded it six times for BBC radio. A live version, taped at a concert date in Stockholm, Sweden, in October 1963, was included on Anthology 1.

In 2018, the music staff of Time Out London ranked "Money (That's What I Want)" at number 25 on their list of the best Beatles songs.

Personnel
John Lennon – vocals, rhythm guitar
Paul McCartney – backing vocals, bass
George Harrison – backing vocals, lead guitar
Ringo Starr – drums
George Martin – piano

Personnel

The Flying Lizards version

In July 1979, the British band the Flying Lizards released a new wave version of the song, as a single and on their first album The Flying Lizards. An unexpected hit, this version peaked at number 5 in the UK chart and at number 50 on the Billboard Hot 100. It also peaked at number 22 on the US dance charts.

Chart performance

Weekly charts

Year-end charts

Other versions
The song has been covered by many artists, with several of the versions appearing in a variety of charts. In 1964, a single by the Kingsmen reached no. 16 on the Billboard Hot 100 and No. 6 on the US R&B charts in 1964, A version by Jennell Hawkins reached No. 17 in the R&B charts in 1962. Jr. Walker & the All Stars reached No. 52 on the Hot 100 and number 35 on the R&B charts in 1966 and Bern Elliott and the Fenmen reached No. 14 on the UK Singles Chart in November 1963.  The song was also a staple for British beat bands.

References

External links

1959 songs
1959 singles
1960 singles
1964 singles
1979 singles
The Beatles songs
The Kingsmen songs
Junior Walker songs
The Flying Lizards songs
Song recordings produced by Berry Gordy
Song recordings produced by George Martin
Songs written by Berry Gordy
Songs written by Janie Bradford
Parlophone singles
Tamla Records singles
Virgin Records singles
The Crickets songs